Jiajia Township (Mandarin: 贾加乡) is a township in Jainca County, Huangnan Tibetan Autonomous Prefecture, Qinghai, China. In 2010, Jiajia Township had a total population of 1,612 people: 789 males and 823 females: 353 under 14 years old, 1,115 aged between 15 and 64 and 144 over 65 years old.

References 

Township-level divisions of Qinghai
Huangnan Tibetan Autonomous Prefecture